Judge Dredd: Pre-Emptive Revenge is the 16th audio drama produced by Big Finish Productions based on the character Judge Dredd in British comic 2000 AD.

Taking place in the immediate aftermath of the Judgement Day storyline, Pre-Emptive Revenge is likewise a crossover between the Judge Dredd and Strontium Dog comics, featuring Toby Longworth as Joe Dredd and Simon Pegg as Johnny Alpha.

Plot 
In the year 2114, Judge Dredd of Mega-City One and the mutant "strontium dog" bounty hunter Johnny Alpha are stuck together in the post-nuclear rad-desert outside the recently destroyed Sino-Cit One. It is the day after Judgement Day, when the two joined forces to defeat Sabbat the Necromagus and end World War Four. The two gripe, annoyed by their clashing natures and the memory of their first meeting ("Top Dogs," Judge Dredd Annual 1990) when Johnny time traveled to Mega-City One from his home in the future to retrieve a fugitive, an action Dredd considered illegal since he does not recognize the authority of bounty hunters, much less ones from another time. Despite their differences, the two reliably look out for each other as they walk back to Hondo City, the mega-city of Japan and nearest center of civilization.

Finding a seemingly abandoned radar tower, the two enter and find the bodies of the crew, apparently killed by Sabbat's zombie army before Dredd and Alpha stopped him. Dredd notices a small radio transceiver wired to the back of each soldier's head, but can only guess at its purpose. Alpha then finds a pen and writes a note to his employers in the future, giving his exact latitude and longitude at that moment in time. He asks Dredd to deliver the note to a law firm in Hondo City that will eventually deliver it to Alpha's bosses in 2178, who will then know exactly from when and where to time-warp him home. Dredd reluctantly agrees, but Alpha does not disappear. Since Dredd is a man of his word, the implication is that something yet to happen will stop the judge from reaching Hondo City safely.

The next night, the two are hailed by a flyer from Hondo City, but their relief is short-lived when the flyer is shot down by an automated missile defense system linked to the tower. The pilot, Judge Goto, survives the crash, but is killed when he steps into a minefield surrounding the tower. Dredd and Alpha then ascend to the highest floor of the tower to find and switch off the missile defense system. They stumble across the tower's last survivor, a conscript Sino-Cit soldier named Lam who refuses to tell them anything and then tries to commit suicide by leaping from the tower. Dredd realizes the tower and its crew are a "pre-emptive revenge" measure by Sino-Cit: as soon as the last member of the crew dies, in the hypothetical event of an attack by Hondo City, the radio transceivers will trigger a "doomsday device" to destroy Hondo. Dredd and Alpha fail to resuscitate Lam and a missile silo opens beneath their feet.

Recognizing the weapon inside as a converted manned rocket, Dredd tries to board it, reasoning that it will have a manual control cockpit aboard. Alpha's mutant enhanced vision reveals the rocket is packed with radioactive waste. Over Dredd's objections, Alpha locks himself inside the rocket, since he can withstand the radiation better than the judge. The rocket takes off and Alpha radios to Dredd that he can't engage the manual override until the rocket reaches apogee and starts hurtling down towards Hondo City. Losing radio contact with the rocket, Dredd drops to the ground and sprints across the minefield to the wreck of Goto's flyer, using its long-range radio to establish contact with Hondo City. Meanwhile, Alpha successfully changes the rocket's course and demands Dredd return the favor by getting him home before the rocket burns up on re-entry.

Dredd contacts Hondo City and obtains the rocket's exact coordinates and vector at that moment in time. He then radios Alpha to say he will deliver the information "postcard," and grudgingly thanks the mutant bounty hunter for his help in saving Hondo. There is no response.

Aboard the rocket, seconds before it breaks apart and burns up, Alpha is yanked through a time portal and splashes down into a recovery pool in 2178. The teleporter crew informs the Doghouse, home base of the strontium dog bounty hunters, that Alpha is back home. Spluttering, Johnny gripes that his bosses don't pay him enough.

Cast 
Toby Longworth - Judge Dredd/Judge Goto/Judge Sadu/Wulf Sternhammer
Simon Pegg - Johnny Alpha/Nelson Kreelman
Ian Hallard - Lam

Related Publications 
Judge Dredd audio dramas
Strontium Dog: Down to Earth
Strontium Dog: Fire from Heaven

External links
Pre-Emptive Revenge at Big Finish Productions

2004 audio plays
Judge Dredd